Epaphroditus Marsh (January 1637 – July 1719) was an Irish politician.  He sat in the Irish House of Commons as a Member of Parliament (MP) for Fethard, Tipperary from 1703 to 1713, for Armagh Borough from 1713 to 1715, and then for Fethard again from 1715 until his death in 1719.

References 

1637 births
1719 deaths
Members of the Parliament of Ireland (pre-1801) for County Tipperary constituencies
Members of the Parliament of Ireland (pre-1801) for County Armagh constituencies
Irish MPs 1703–1713
Irish MPs 1713–1714
Irish MPs 1715–1727